Raymond Charles Vietzen was an American automobile dealer, artifact collector, and amateur archaeologist. As prolific author and artist from Elyria, Ohio, he wrote and illustrated numerous articles, books, and chapters in edited volumes on the history and prehistory of North America winning him many honors—chief among them the title of "Colonel." Col. Vietzen is probably best known for establishing the Indian Ridge Museum in 1930 and for founding the Archaeological Society of Ohio (formerly the Ohio Indian Relic Collectors Society), whereby he presided as its editor, president, secretary, and treasurer from 1941 to 1980. Most of his publications are dedicated to the excavations that he led at many famous archaeological sites in Illinois, Kentucky, Ohio, Oklahoma, and Tennessee. His relic collection was sold by Old Barn Auction between 1998 and 1999 grossing $1,777,652. In 2000, Colonel Matthew W. Nahorn founded the New Indian Ridge Museum in Amherst, Ohio, celebrating Col. Vietzen's legacy. However, Col. Vietzen has received criticism for digging Native American graves, as well as the sale and trade of antiquities.

Publications 
Col. Vietzen was an authority on archaeology, geography, and history of the midwestern and eastern United States, particularly for Kentucky, Illinois, Ohio, Oklahoma, and Tennessee, between 1941 and 1995. He penned over 35 publications. They include at least 17 books, 14 peer-reviewed scholarly articles, and 4 chapters in edited academic volumes. Many of these are available at public libraries or online.
 
 
 
Vietzen, Raymond (1946). "Birdstones and their probable use". Journal of the Illinois State Archaeological Society. 4 (2): 15–30.
Vietzen, Raymond (1946). "Prehistory of the Black River Valley." Ohio Indian Relic Collectors Society Bulletin 15: 6–9.
Vietzen, Raymond (1946). "Fraternizing with the ancient Kentuckians". Ohio Indian Relic Collectors Society Bulletin. 16: 3-13.
Vietzen, Raymond (1946). "Along the Sandusky." https://www.worldcat.org/title/2265415Society Bulletin 17: 6, 8.
Vietzen, Raymond (1946). "Morrison site." Ohio Indian Relic Collectors Society Bulletin 17: 8, 10.
Vietzen, Raymond (1947). "Petroglyphs on the Ohio." Ohio Indian Relic Collectors Society Bulletin 19: 10–16.
Vietzen, Raymond (1948). "Prehistoric pipes from Lorain County, Ohio." Ohio Indian Relic Collectors Society Bulletin 20: 9–10.
Vietzen, Raymond (1949). "The Hasler mound." Ohio Indian Relic Collectors Society Bulletin 21: 1–14.
Vietzen, Raymond (1950). Grimm, Robert (ed.) "My first visit to Cahokia." Cahokia Brought to Life: An Artifactual Story of America's Great Monument. St. Louis, Missouri: Greater St. Louis Archaeological Society. pp. 70–72.
Vietzen, Raymond (1952). "Cave crawln’." Ohio Archaeologist [N.S.] 2 (3): 31.
Vietzen, Raymond (1952). "A magnificent birdstone." Ohio Archaeologist [N.S.] 2 (3): 32–34.
Vietzen, Raymond (1953). "A birdstone study." Ohio Archaeologist [N.S.] 3 (2): 30–34.
 
 
Vietzen, Raymond (1966). Aborigines of Cansadooharie. Ohio Genealogical Society Report 6 (2): 3.
Vietzen, Raymond (1967). "Lorain County's Indians." Pathways of the Pioneers 2 (3).
 
 
 
Vietzen, Raymond (1974). Lorain County Historical Society (ed.) "Prologue." Lorain County Sesquicentennial. Elyria, Ohio: American Multi-Service. pp. 6–7.
Vietzen, Raymond (1974). Lorain County Historical Society (ed.) "Indian Ridge Museum." Lorain County Sesquicentennial. Elyria, Ohio: American Multi-Service. p. 17.
 
 
Vietzen, Raymond (1980). "Fakes." Ohio Archaeologist 30 (4): 37–39.
 
 
 
Vietzen, Raymond (1988). Rothgery, James and Glendening, Anne (eds.) "Sheffield." Kipton-Camden Township History. Wellington, Ohio: Camden Historical Society.

Honors 
Col. Veitzen received numerous awards and honors for his accomplishments. For his achievements as an artist, author, archaeologist, artifact collector, historian, he 14 accolades were bestowed upon him. Some of the most prestigious are listed below.
 Eugene Field Society, 1941
 International Mark Twain Society, as well as the American Academy of Political and Social Science, 1944
 Honorary "Kentucky Colonel" and "Citizen of Tennessee" by gubernatorial commissions 1957
 Ohioana Author Award, 1962
 Kentucky Historical Society by the state's legislature, 1969
 "Who's Who in American Education," 1962–1965
 "Who's Who in Antiquities,"  1972
 International "Who's Who in Art," 1973
 Ohio Sesquicentennial Committee for Lorain County by gubernatorial commission, 1974
 "Who's Who in America," 1975
 "Man of Achievement" by the Ohio State House of Representatives, 1981
 Lifetime Member of the Lorain County Historical Society
 The Founding Fathers of the Archaeological Society of Ohio

Excavations 
Col. Veitzen excavated hundreds of archaeological sites in the U.S. Among his contributions to knowledge are 15 well-know areas of interest archaeologically and historically in Kentucky, Illinois, Ohio, Oklahoma, and Tennessee. They have Smithsonian trinomial designations. For example, Cahokia, a UNESCO World Heritage Site, is 11MS2 with "11" for state of Illinois, "MS" for Madison County, and "2" for the second site to be documented therein.
 Spiro Mounds (34LF40) LeFlore County, Oklahoma, 1936
 Page Site (15LO1) Lewisburg, Logan County, Kentucky, 1938–1942
 Moes Site (33LN55) Brownhelm, Lorain County, Ohio, 1940
 Seaman's Fort Site (33ER85) Milan, Erie County, Ohio, 1940–1942
 Morris-Franks Site(33LN8) Brownhelm, Lorain County, Ohio, 1941–1942
 Glover's Cave (15CH315) Trenton, Christian County, Kentucky, 1941–1955
 Cahokia (11MS2) Collinsville, Madison County, Illinois, 1949
 Pennington Bend sites at Two Rivers (40DV41, 40DV101, 40DV304, and 40DV566), Nashville, Davidson County, Tennessee, 1950
 Eiden Archaeological District (33LN14, 33LN40, 33LN46) Sheffield, Lorain County, Ohio, 1958–1959
 Riker Site (33TU2) Midvale, Tuscarawas County, Ohio, 1965–1967

References

External links 
 Raymond Charles Vietzen on WorldCat Identities
 New Indian Ridge Museum

American writers
1907 births
1995 deaths
American automobile salespeople
American illustrators
Collectors of Indigenous art of the Americas
Collections of museums in the United States
20th-century American archaeologists